This is a list of individuals who were former or serving Members of Parliament for the House of Commons of the United Kingdom and who died in the 2020s.

2020

2021

2022

2023

Notes

See also
List of United Kingdom MPs who died in the 1990s
List of United Kingdom MPs who died in the 2000s
List of United Kingdom MPs who died in the 2010s

Died in the 2020s
2020s politics-related lists
Lists of deaths in 2020